Alejandro Olivares Monterrubio (born 26 February 1959) is a Mexican politician affiliated with the Institutional Revolutionary Party.  he served as Deputy of the LX Legislature of the Mexican Congress representing the State of Mexico.

References

1959 births
Living people
Politicians from the State of Mexico
Institutional Revolutionary Party politicians
21st-century Mexican politicians
Deputies of the LX Legislature of Mexico
Members of the Chamber of Deputies (Mexico) for the State of Mexico